Hani Sarie-Eldin is an Egyptian lawyer and writer. He has published many articles and books in English and Arabic focusing on law, economic development and how economic reform is not possible without institutional and social reform to turn policies and visions into reality.

He has been chairman of the Capital Market Authority of Egypt.

Publications 
Sarie-Eldin has numerous legal publications in Arabic and English.

Arabic books  
 Egyptian Companies Law, (4 editions: 1998; 2000; 2003; 2008), Dar El Nahda.
 Negotiation of Contracts, 1999, Dar Al Nahda Al -Arabia.
 Infrastructure Projects Privately Financed, 2001, Dar Al Nahda Al-Arabia.
 Transfer of Technology, 2003, Dar Al Nahda Al-Arabia.
 Mandatory Tender Offers,2013, Dar Al Nahda A-Arabia.

English books  
 Consortia Agreements in the International Construction Industry: With Special Reference to Egypt, 1996, Kluwer Law International.
 Commercial Companies in Egypt, 2000, Cairo University.

Arabic articles 
Sarie-Eldin has written many research articles in Arabic, some of which have been translated to English and French.
 Arbitration in Joint Ventures Disputes, 1998, Al Ahkam, pp. 81–121.
 BOT Projects, 1999, Arab Universities Union, vol 9,pp. 321–397.
 Private-Public-Partnerships, Al Ahram Al -Ektisady, vol.177, Sep 2002, pp. 3– 175.
 Weekly articles in Al-Akhbar newspaper, titled "Out Of The Box" (Men Kharg el Sandok) since July 2014.

English articles 
 Financial Disputes in the Arab Middle East with Special Reference to Egypt, published in "Non-Judicial Dispute Settlement in International Financial Transactions", 2000, Norton and Andens.
 International Construction Contracts in the Middle East: An Analysis of the Application of FIDIC Conditions, published in "Commercial Law in the Middle East" (ed), 1995, Graham & Trotman.
 Securities Law Models in Emerging Economies, by Sarie Eldin and Joseph Norton, published in "Emerging Financial Markets and the Role of International Financial Organizations", 1996, Norton and Andens.

References 

Egyptian businesspeople
1966 births
Living people
Free Egyptians Party politicians
Egyptian academics